Nadine Alexandra Dewi Ames (born May 23, 1991) is an Indonesian actress and beauty pageant titleholder who was crowned Puteri Indonesia 2010 and represented her country in the 2011 Miss Universe pageant, but was unplaced.

Early life
Ames was born in Winchester, England. Her family moved to Jakarta when she was two months old. She spent most of her childhood in Jakarta, attending the North Jakarta International School and Gandhi Memorial International School, she also took modelling course at the OQ Modelling School, Kelapa Gading which lead to her appearance in the Indonesian soap opera Inikah Cinta. She is fluent in English, French and Indonesian.

Puteri Indonesia 2010 and Miss Universe 2011
Ames, who stands , competed as the representative of Jakarta SCR 4, winning Indonesia's's national beauty pageant, Puteri Indonesia 2010, in Jakarta on October 8, 2010. Ames represented Indonesia in the 2011 Miss Universe pageant, in São Paulo, Brazil on September 12, 2011, but was unplaced.

Filmography

Movies

References

External links
 
 Official Puteri Indonesia Official Website
 Official Miss Universe Official Website

Living people
1991 births
Indonesian beauty pageant winners
Indonesian television actresses
People from Jakarta
Indo people
Javanese people
Indonesian people of British descent
Indonesian people of Welsh descent
Indonesian people of English descent
Puteri Indonesia winners
Miss Universe 2011 contestants